is a Japanese feminine given name. Minako can be written using different kanji characters:
美奈子, "beauty, apple tree, child"
美那子, "beauty, unknown, child" or "beauty, child"
美菜子, "beauty, (green) vegetable, child"
美名子, "beauty, name, child"
美梨子, "beauty, pear, child"
聖名子, "holy, name, child"
聖奈子, "holy, apple tree, child or holy child"
皆子, "everybody/all, child"
水奈子 "water, apple tree, child" or "water, child"
実奈子 "truth, apple tree, child"
実菜子 "truth, (green) vegetable, child"
実那子 "truth, unknown, child" or "truth, child"
実名子 "truth, name, child"
The name can also be written in hiragana or katakana.

People
Minako (美奈子), a member of the Japanese musical group Kome Kome Club
, Japanese singer
, Japanese singer
, a Japanese illustrator, game character designer, and manga artist
, Japanese gravure model 
, a Japanese voice actress and singer
, a Japanese contemporary artist
, Japanese author and social critic
, Japanese archer
, Japanese women's footballer

Fictional characters
Minako Aino (also Sailor Venus), a character in the Sailor Moon series
Minako Arisato, one of the given names to the female protagonist in Persona 3 Portable 
Minako Yurihara, a character in the light novel Boogiepop series

References

Minako
 2. http://www.baby-vornamen.de/Maedchen/M/Mi/Minako/
 3. http://www.vorname.com/name,Minako.html